Japanese missions to Silla represent an aspect of the international relations of mutual Silla-Japanese contacts and communication.  The bilateral exchanges were intermittent.

The unique nature of these bilateral diplomatic exchanges evolved from a conceptual framework developed by the Chinese.   
 648 — At the request of Japanese government, the Silla ambassador in China delivers a Japanese letter to the court of the Tang emperor; the message conveyed a message wishing good health to the emperor.
 804 — Mine no Masatao sent with letters from Japanese Council of State.
 836 — Ki no Mitsu with letter from Council of State.

According to the Nihon Shoki, in the years 501-700 Japan sent 328 official missions to Paekche, 316 to Silla, 146 to Goguryeo, 193 to Imna (Mimana), 20 to Gaya, 20 to Tamna, and 5 to Samhan kingdoms. Exchanges of embassies with the Korean kingdoms of Paekche and Silla were critical for informing the Japanese of cultural developments on the continent.

See also
 Japanese missions to Paekche
 Japanese missions to Joseon
 Japanese missions to Imperial China

Notes

References
 Kang, Etsuko Hae-jin. (1997). Diplomacy and Ideology in Japanese-Korean Relations: from the Fifteenth to the Eighteenth Century. Basingstoke, Hampshire; Macmillan. ; 
 Nussbaum, Louis-Frédéric and Käthe Roth. (2005).  Japan encyclopedia. Cambridge: Harvard University Press. ;  OCLC 58053128
 Wang, Zhenping. (2005). Ambassadors from the Islands of Immortals: China-Japan Relations in the Han-Tang Period. Honolulu: University of Hawai'i Press. ;  OCLC 58647984

Diplomacy